The Jane Coffin Childs Memorial Fund for Medical Research (the "JCC"), established in 1937, awards the "Jane Coffin Childs Postdoctoral Fellowship" for research in the medical and related sciences bearing on cancer.

History
The Fund was founded on June 11, 1937, by Starling Winston Childs and Alice S. Childs, in memory of Jane Coffin Childs. Its funds have been on the order of $3 million.

Description
Currently, the Foundation awards 20 to 30 fellowships per year. The fellowship is regarded as one of the most prestigious fellowships in the US, and postdoctoral candidates are awarded with a three-year support. The researchers and the research labs where the fellows conduct their projects have made major scientific contributions in areas such as the advancement of understanding the human genome, and the application of genetic approaches to understanding pathway regulation, and stem cell activation. There are nearly two dozen individuals associated with the Fund—as grantees, fellows, and advisers—have won Nobel Prizes in physiology, medicine, and chemistry.

Over the years, the Fund has attracted distinguished scientists for its Board of Scientific Advisers. As of 2020, 17 of the former Board members have earned the Nobel Prize.

Members of the Board of Scientific Advisers have included:

 Ali Shilatifard
 Elizabeth Blackburn
 Peter Cresswell
 Elaine Fuchs
 Tony Hunter
 Cynthia Kenyon
 John Kuriyan
 Susan McConnell
 Thomas D. Pollard
 Randy Schekman
 Charles J. Sherr
 Pamela A. Silver
 Graham C. Walker

The Jane Coffin Childs Memorial Fund for Medical Research is dedicated to providing financial support to offer highly qualified scientists the opportunity to pursue research into the causes and origins of cancer. The goal of the Fund is to provide support to the brightest individual scientists pursuing careers in cancer research while promoting and emphasizing the value and contribution of the individual in keeping with the spirit of the conception of the Fund.

Notable fellows have included:
 Jeremy M. Berg
 David S. Cafiso
 Margaret T. Fuller
 Juan E. González
 Susan Gottesman
 Enoch Huang
 Liqun Luo
 Lara Mahal
 William McGinnis
 Jessica Polka
 James A. Shapiro
 Joan A. Steitz
 Clare M. Waterman-Storer

See also
 Helen Hay Whitney Foundation
 Damon Runyon Cancer Research Foundation
 Life Sciences Research Foundation

Notes

External links
 The official JCC site

Biomedical research foundations
1937 establishments
Fellowships
Medical and health foundations in the United States